Tragic Return is a 1952 Italian drama film directed by Pier Luigi Faraldo.

Cast
 Doris Duranti as Elisa
 Marcello Mastroianni as Marco
 Franca Marzi as Donna Carmela - Nicola's girlfriend
  as Giovanna
 Dante Maggio as Nicola
 
 Paolo Dola
 Benedetta Rutili as Elisa

References

External links

1952 films
1952 drama films
1950s Italian-language films
Italian black-and-white films
Italian drama films
1950s Italian films